C-C motif chemokine ligand 24 is a protein that in humans is encoded by the CCL24 gene.

Function

This gene belongs to the subfamily of small cytokine CC genes. Cytokines are a family of secreted proteins involved in immunoregulatory and inflammatory processes. The CC cytokines are proteins characterized by two adjacent cysteines. The cytokine encoded by this gene displays chemotactic activity on resting T lymphocytes, a minimal activity on neutrophils, and is negative on monocytes and activated T lymphocytes. The protein is also a strong suppressor of colony formation by a multipotential hematopoietic progenitor cell line. [provided by RefSeq, Jul 2008].

References

Further reading